Alexander Cairncross (1637–1701) was Archbishop of Glasgow 1684–1687.

Life
Alexander Cairncross was descended from the ancient family of Cairncross of Cowmull.  For some time he followed the trade of a dyer in the Canongate of Edinburgh.  Subsequently, he became parson of Dumfries, where he remained until 1684 when, by the recommendation of the Duke of Queensberry, he was promoted to the see of Brechin, from which he was in a few months promoted to that of Glasgow.  Having incurred the displeasure of the Lord Chancellor, the Earl of Perth, he was in January 1687 removed from the see, but after the Glorious Revolution he obtained the notice of the new powers, and in 1693 was made Bishop of Raphoe in Ireland, where he remained until his death on 14 May 1701.  By will he left a great deal of money to the poor of the parish of Raphoe, and the tenth part of his personal estate to the episcopal clergy of the Kingdom of Scotland.  He was buried in the Cathedral of Raphoe.

References
 Registrum Episcopatus Brechinensis (Bannatyne Club, 1856), p. 141 (App.) 79
 Keith's Scottish Bishops (Russell), 168, 268–9
 Ware's Works (Harris), i. 277.

Attribution

1637 births
1701 deaths
Bishops of Glasgow
Bishops of Brechin (Church of Scotland)
Chancellors of the University of Glasgow
Anglican bishops of Raphoe
Scottish Restoration bishops
Members of the Parliament of Scotland 1685–1686